Centenary Methodist Church, also known as Centenary Memorial United Methodist Church, is a historic Methodist church located at 2585 NC 130 E near Rowland, Robeson County, North Carolina.  It was built in 1885, and enlarged and modified in the Classical Revival style in 1903.  It is a one-story, gable front frame building with a rectangular steeple and vestibule.  A gable-front portico with cornice returns, supported by two slender wood columns, was added to the church in 1982.  Adjacent to the church is the contributing cemetery with approximately 160 marked graves.

It was added to the National Register of Historic Places in 2007.

References

Methodist churches in North Carolina
Churches on the National Register of Historic Places in North Carolina
Neoclassical architecture in North Carolina
Churches completed in 1885
19th-century Methodist church buildings in the United States
Buildings and structures in Robeson County, North Carolina
National Register of Historic Places in Robeson County, North Carolina
1885 establishments in North Carolina
Neoclassical church buildings in the United States